The following is a list of football stadiums in Venezuela, ordered by capacity. Currently all stadiums with a capacity of more than 1,000 are included.

See also
List of South American stadiums by capacity

References

Venezuela
stadiums
Football stadiums